Miss Bolivia is a national beauty pageant in Bolivia. The pageant was founded in 1959, where the winners were sent to Miss Universe.

History
The contest was founded in 1959 and Gloria Suárez de Limpias has been the event's director since 1979. As of 2019, Bolivia has not won a Miss Universe or Miss World title.

A three-hour parade is held annually on August 5. Bolivian TV channel Unitel broadcasts it to the rest of Latin America, and cable broadcasts are available in the United States. For approximately one month, there are several preliminary events and presentations regarding the main parade.

Official Divisions

Beni
 Miss Beni
 Srta. Beni
 Miss Moxitania 
Chuquisaca
 Miss Chuquisaca
 Srta. Chuquisaca
 Miss La Plata 
Cochabamba
 Miss Cochabamba
 Srta. Cochabamba
 Miss Valle 

La Paz
 Miss La Paz
 Srta. La Paz
 Miss Illimani 
Oruro
 Miss Oruro
 Srta. Oruro
Pando
 Miss Pando
 Srta. Pando
Potosí
 Miss Potosí
 Srta. Potosí

Santa Cruz
 Miss Santa Cruz
 Srta. Santa Cruz
 Miss Litoral
 Srta. Litoral
Tarija
 Miss Tarija
 Srta. Tarija
 Miss Andalucía

Titleholders 
The following women have represented Bolivia in the Big Four international beauty pageants, the four major international beauty pageants for women. These are Miss World, Miss Universe, Miss International and Miss Earth.;

Titleholders under Promociones Gloria org.

Miss Bolivia Universo

The winner of Miss Bolivia Universo represents her country at the Miss Universe. On occasion, when the winner does not qualify (due to age) for either contest, a runner-up is sent.

Miss Bolivia Mundo

The winner of Miss Bolivia Mundo represents her country at the Miss World pageant.Miss Bolivia InternacionalBetween 1969 and 2014 the second runner-up of Miss Bolivia represented Bolivia at the Miss International pageant. Since 2015 after the committee divided pageant into two pageants, the Miss Bolivia Internacional selects by the first runner-up of Miss Bolivia pageant.Miss Bolivia TierraBetween 2001 and 2014 the third runner-up of Miss Bolivia represented Bolivia at the Miss Earth pageant. Began in 2015 the second runner-up of Miss Bolivia will go to Miss Earth pageant.''

See also
Mister Bolivia

References

External links
Miss Bolivia official site
www.missbolivia.org

Bolivia
Beauty pageants in Bolivia
Bolivia
1959 establishments in Bolivia
Bolivian awards
Bolivia